The Edward Elderkin House, also known as the Round House, is a historic octagon house built in 1856 by Edward Elderkin. It is located at 127 South Lincoln Street in Elkhorn, Wisconsin, United States. On May 3, 1974, it was added to the National Register of Historic Places. The two-story home was constructed of buff brick and features a wrap-around porch, a tall, windowed cupola and a central chimney.

References

Houses in Walworth County, Wisconsin
Houses on the National Register of Historic Places in Wisconsin
Octagon houses in Wisconsin
National Register of Historic Places in Walworth County, Wisconsin
Elkhorn, Wisconsin
Houses completed in 1856